Abhaneri, also spelled Abaneri, is a village in the Dausa district of the Indian state of Rajasthan. Abhaneri is popular for the Chand Baori step well and Harshat Mata Temple.

History 
The village was originally named Abha Nagari, ("City of Brightness"), but over time the name evolved to its present form. Originally ruled by the Chahamanas of Shakambhari, the area was later conquered by Muslim invasions under Mahmud of Ghazni and later ruled by the Mughals. Later the Maratha conquered the area and it became a part of Jaipur State until independence. Abhaneri is small in size, but attracts tourists from across the globe.

Geography 
The village is located between the city of Bandikui and the town of Sikandra that lies on the Jaipur-Agra highway. It is 95 km from Jaipur and about 210 km south of Delhi. The village is close to State Highway 25.

Address 
Near Harshat Mata Temple, Abhaneri,

Dausa, Bandikui, Rajasthan, 303313, India

Landmarks 
The Archaeological Survey of India (ASI) has inscribed an ancient mound in the area in 1951 with excavated red and grey slipware.

The Chand Baori is one of the oldest, deepest and largest baoris (stepwells) in Rajasthan. The oldest parts of the structure date back to the 8th century, and significant additions were made in the 18th century. The stepwell consists of three flight of stairs descending into the earth with a subterranean palace on one side. The flight of stairs and the palace are arranged in a square pattern with the well lying at the bottom. The flight of steps descends thirteen stories.

The Harshat Mata Temple is located near the Chand Baori. It was a ritual to wash hands and feet at Chand Baori before visiting the temple. It is dedicated to Harshat Mata, the goddess of joy and happiness. It was constructed in the 8th century. Substantially destroyed by Islamic invaders in the 10th century, the remains of the temple still boast architectural and sculptural styles of 10th-century India. The temple is on a raised platform from where unrestricted views of nearby fertile regions can be seen. A small village nearby houses many artisans.

References

External links 

Villages in Dausa district